Introducing the Fabulous Trudy Pitts is the debut album by jazz organist Trudy Pitts which was recorded in 1967 and released on the Prestige label.

Reception

Allmusic awarded the album 3 stars stating "A strong debut from Trudy Pitts, divided between covers of pretty mainstream standards and gutsier straight soul-jazz".

Track listing 
All compositions by Bill Carney except as noted
 "Steppin' in Minor" - 4:30  
 "The Spanish Flea" (Julius Wechter) - 4:20 
 "Music to Watch Girls By" (Sid Ramin) - 4:35 
 "Something Wonderful" (Richard Rodgers, Oscar Hammerstein II) - 3:25  
 "Take Five" (Paul Desmond) - 4:28  
 "It Was a Very Good Year" (Ervin Drake) - 3:45  
 "Siete" - 4:00  
 "Night Song" (Charles Strouse, Lee Adams) - 3:56  
 "Fiddlin'" - 3:55  
 "Matchmaker, Matchmaker" (Jerry Bock, Sheldon Harnick) - 4:13

Personnel 
Trudy Pitts - Hammond B3 organ, vocals
Pat Martino - guitar
Bill Carney - drums
Carmell Johnson - congas

References 

Trudy Pitts albums
1967 debut albums
Prestige Records albums
Albums recorded at Van Gelder Studio
Albums produced by Cal Lampley